Aindrias Ó Caoimh (born 1 April 1950) is a retired Irish judge who has served as a Judge of the European Court of Justice from 2004 to 2015. He previously served as a Judge of the High Court from 1999 to 2004.

He is a son of Aindrias Ó Caoimh, who was twice Attorney General of Ireland and who was also a Judge of the European Court of Justice from 1974 until 1985.

He was educated at University College Dublin and King's Inns. He was called to the Bar in 1972 and became a Senior Counsel in 1994. He was a lecturer in European Law at King's Inns.

He was appointed to the European Court of Justice on 13 October 2004.

His uncle Brian Ó Cuív was the son-in-law of Éamon de Valera.

See also
List of members of the European Court of Justice

References

1950 births
21st-century Irish people
Living people
Alumni of University College Dublin
Irish barristers
High Court judges (Ireland)
European Court of Justice judges
People educated at Synge Street CBS
Irish judges of international courts and tribunals
Alumni of King's Inns